Six Flags Hurricane Harbor Rockford (formerly known as Magic Waters) is a water park owned by the Rockford Park District and operated by Six Flags. It is located in Cherry Valley, Winnebago County, Illinois, and located next to the interchange between Interstate 39/U.S. Route 51 and Interstate 90 near U.S. Route 20.

History
Magic Waters, was built in 1984 under private ownership. Even though it was privately owned, the Rockford Park District was involved in planning.  In 1986, Magic Waters private ownership filed for Chapter 11 bankruptcy due to low attendance. Then, the property was seized by the now-defunct Amcore Bank. The Rockford Park District became involved with the park and increased park attendance by 50%. In 1988, Rockford Park District with marketing efforts by Midwest Marketing Inc, Magic Waters reached a peak attendance of 370,000. 

In 1993, Splash Magic River, a lazy river ride was added to the park. In 1997, 4 years after Splash Magic River was added, Splash Magic Island, now Tiki Island was added to the park. The attraction was geared towards families. 

In 2000, a water coaster named Splash Blaster was added. The ride was 80 feet tall. The ride cost $3 million to build. It would be removed in 2015 due to 12 lawsuits against the park from back injuries. 

In 2004, The Abyss, a dark tunnel tube slide 5 stories high was added to the park. The ride twists and turns multiple times before it splashes the rider into a pool of daylight.   

On May 23, 2009, a few years after The Abyss was added, a new water slide was announced. The ride would be called Typhoon Terror. The ride is a tube slide that is 65 foot tall and can fit 2-4 people in the tube.  

On May 30, 2012, Double Dare Drop, a speed slide ride was added. The name was picked after a contest in October 2011. The ride is 75 feet tall and was built by Rockford Structures Construction Co. 

In July 2014, a dozen lawsuits were filed against Magic Waters and the Rockford Park District due to the now removed ride Splash Blaster over back injuries. The Rockford Park District has settled the suits, totaling $2.53 million. This led the park to remove the ride on September 3, 2015.

On February 15, 2017, Magic Waters announced that their AquaLoop water slide would be called Screaming Lizard. It would open the following summer. The ride features a 45 degree inclined loop.

On October 9, 2018, Six Flags announced that they had reached an agreement with Rockford Park District to operate Magic Waters Waterpark starting in the spring of 2019 for 10 years. Six Flags will have to pay $425,000 to the Rockford Park District annually. On August 29, 2019, Six Flags renamed Magic Waters to Six Flags Hurricane Harbor Rockford, and will enforce the Hurricane Harbor name for the 2020 season. It was also announced that Tidal Wave would be added to the park as the first "tailspin" slide in the Midwest by WhiteWater West.

Due to the COVID-19 pandemic, Six Flags suspended all parks on March 13, 2020. Six Flags Hurricane Harbor Rockford was expected to open mid-May, but was delayed. It was announced on July 9, 2020, along with Hurricane Harbor Chicago, that the park would reopen on July 20, 2020.  Tidal Wave was delayed to 2021.

In 2021, Tidal Wave soft opened to the media on May 28 and officially opened on May 29. The ride is the parks' first waterpark addition under Six Flags' operation.

Slides and attractions

Dining
Season Dining Passes are available at most restaurants. 
Beachside Funnel Cake, a funnel cake restaurant with funnel cake sundaes and root beer floats.
Hawaiian Hideaway,  a snack bar with snacks such as pretzels and churros
Surfside Café, a restaurant with chicken sandwiches, Italian beef, hot dogs, chicken tenders and salads.
Dippin Dots, Flash-frozen ice cream pellets. There are 2 Dippin Dots in the park.
Snack Shack, a snack bar with pretzels, churros and nachos.
Tiki Tacos, beef tacos, chicken tacos and chips and salsa.
Paradise Pizza, sells pizza, meatball sandwiches, and salads.

See also 

 Incidents at Six Flags parks
 Six Flags Hurricane Harbor, a brand of Six Flags water parks
 Six Flags Hurricane Harbor Chicago, a Six Flags Hurricane Harbor water park in Gurnee, Illinois

References

External links
 Six Flags Hurricane Harbor Rockford — official website

Interstate 39
Interstate 90
Rockford metropolitan area, Illinois
U.S. Route 20
U.S. Route 51
Water parks in Illinois
Buildings and structures in Winnebago County, Illinois
Tourist attractions in Winnebago County, Illinois
Six Flags water parks